Herman Schneidman (November 22, 1913 – August 12, 2008) was a professional American football player for the Green Bay Packers and the Chicago Cardinals.

College career
Schneidman played collegiate football at the University of Iowa.

Professional career

Green Bay Packers
When Scheidman left the University of Iowa, he signed with the Green Bay Packers and played mainly Blocking back, the forerunner to a fullback, on offense. He played with the Packers from 1935 to 1939 and was a member of their 1936 and 1939 league titles. Schneidman played in 40 games for the Packers with 16 starts. He rushed 13 times for 37 yards during his career and caught seven passes for 119 yards and two touchdowns. Schneidman wore No. 4 during his first three seasons in Green Bay, a jersey later made famous by quarterback Brett Favre. Herm attempted to play for the Packers in 1940 but was released in training camp.

Chicago Cardinals
After being released by the Packers, Herm signed with the Chicago Cardinals and played for one more season before retiring and joining the Navy.

Death
Scheidman died on August 12, 2008 in Quincy, Illinois, at the age of 95.

References

External links
Packers.com: All Time Roster  Player profile
 

1913 births
2008 deaths
Sportspeople from Rock Island, Illinois
Players of American football from Illinois
University of Iowa alumni
Green Bay Packers players
Chicago Cardinals players
Iowa Hawkeyes football players